Auburn is an electoral district of the Legislative Assembly of the Australian state of New South Wales in Sydney's West. It is currently represented by Lynda Voltz, after the 2019 election.

Auburn includes the suburbs of Auburn, Berala, Birrong, Lidcombe, Potts Hill, Sefton, Rookwood, Wentworth Point and parts of Bankstown, Bass Hill, Chester Hill, Silverwater and Yagoona.

Members

History
Auburn was created in 1927. It has been held by the Labor Party for its entire existence, and for most of that time has been one of Labor's safest seats in New South Wales. It is considered a part of Labor's heartland in Western Sydney.

Auburn was once represented by former Premier, Jack Lang, and later by his son, Chris Lang. The seat was once vacant for four months; between December, 1955 and March, 1956; as a result of the death of Edgar Dring. A by-election was not held, given the relatively short amount of time left until the 1956 New South Wales state election.

Election results

References

Electoral districts of New South Wales
Constituencies established in 1927
1927 establishments in Australia